The Evert–Navratilova rivalry was a tennis rivalry in the 1970s and 1980s between Chris Evert and Martina Navratilova, widely regarded as two of the greatest tennis players of all time. It is considered to be one of the greatest rivalries in tennis history and sports in general. The pair contested 80 matches between 1973 and 1988 (60 of which were finals), with Navratilova leading the overall head-to-head 43–37 and 36–24 in finals.

In the 12 years from the introduction of the WTA rankings in November 1975 until August 1987, one of the two held the top spot in all but 23 weeks, switching multiple times between 1978 and 1985. More specifically, in the first 615 weeks of the WTA rankings they collectively held the No. 1 ranking for 592 weeks, Navratilova at 332 weeks and Evert at 260 weeks. Such was their dominance over other players, that for the period 1977-1987 when the two rivals were first ranked No.1 & No.2 (and generally No.1 & No.2 for the entire ten year period), only three times was any other player able to beat them both back-to-back in the same tournament: Evonne Goolagong Cawley at the 1978 Virginia Slims of Boston (SF Navratilova 7-6 7-6/F Evert 4-6 6-1 6-4); Tracy Austin at the 1979 U.S. Open (SF Navratilova 7-5 7-5/F Evert 6-4 6-3); and Hana Mandlíková at the 1985 U.S. Open (SF Evert 4-6 6-2 6-3/F Navratilova 7-6 1-6 7-6). From the 1981 Australian Open to the 1985 Wimbledon Championships, the duo won a record 15 consecutive major singles titles. From the 1981 Wimbledon Championships to the 1988 Australian Open, they won 22 of 27 major singles titles and at least one of them appeared in each of those 27 finals. The five defeats in those 27 finals were Navratilova losing to Austin at the 1981 US Open, to Mandlíková at the 1985 US Open and 1987 Australian Open and to Steffi Graf at the 1987 French Open. Evert lost to Graf in the 1988 Australian Open final.

Evert and Navratilova encountered each other most often on the faster court surfaces (grass and indoors), where Navratilova's offensive serve-and-volley style of play gave her the upper hand over Evert's counter-attacking baseline approach. Evert enjoyed more success in the rivalry on hard courts and especially on clay courts. Navratilova led Evert 10–5 on grass, 9–7 on outdoor hard courts, and 21–14 on indoor courts, but Evert led 11–3 on clay courts. Evert led their head-to-head in three-set match wins 15–14, but Navratilova led 29–22 in straight-set encounters. Navratilova was most dominant in encounters in majors, leading 14–8 overall and 10–4 in finals. Evert led their head-to-head for each of the first six years of their rivalry (1973–78), whereas Navratilova had the upper hand for each year in the rest of their rivalry (1979, 1981–88).

Grand Slam matches
 Final matches indicated in bold.

Head-to-head breakdown 
 All matches: (80) Navratilova 43–37
 All finals: (60) Navratilova 36–24
 Grand Slam matches: Navratilova 14–8
 Grand Slam finals: Navratilova 10–4
 Grand Slam semifinals: Tied 4–4
 WTA Tour Championships finals: Navratilova 2–1
 Non-Grand Slam & Non-WTA Tour Championships finals: Navratilova 24–20
 Three-set matches: Evert 15–14
 Straight-set matches: Navratilova 29–22

Results on each surface 
 Hard courts: Tied 8–8
 Clay courts: Evert 11–3
 Grass courts: Navratilova 10–5
 Carpet courts: Navratilova 22–13

List of all matches
WTA, Fed Cup, and Grand Slam main draw results included.

Martina Navratilova leads the head-to-head 43–37. Walkovers are not counted as official wins or losses.

Singles: 80

Evert 37 – Navratilova 43

Grand Slam performance timeline comparison
For all players in their era see: Tennis performance timeline comparison (women)

1971–1977

 The Australian Open was held twice in 1977, in January (J) and December (D).

1978–1984

1985–1991

1992–2006

WTA rankings

Year-end ranking timeline

See also

List of tennis rivalries
Grand Slam (tennis)
Chris Evert career statistics
Martina Navratilova career statistics
Unmatched

References

External links
 International Tennis Federation (ITF) player head to head 

Chris Evert
Martina Navratilova
Tennis rivalries
Sports rivalries in the United States
1970s in sports
1980s in sports